Davide Redzepi (born 15 January 1988) is a Swiss footballer who plays as defender for FC Locarno.

References

http://www.football.ch/sfl/821107/de/Kader.aspx?tId=0&pId=20087

1988 births
Living people
Swiss men's footballers
BSC Young Boys players
SR Delémont players
AC Bellinzona players
Swiss Super League players
Association football defenders
Swiss people of Albanian descent
Place of birth missing (living people)